Ankyra is a genus of green algae in the family Characiaceae. This genus of algae is closely related to Atractomorpha and Sphaeroplea.

References

Further reading

External links

Sphaeropleales genera
Sphaeropleales